Jamestown is a city in Stutsman County, North Dakota, United States. It is the county seat of Stutsman County. The population was 15,849 at the 2020 census, making it the ninth largest city in North Dakota. Jamestown was founded in 1883 and is home to the University of Jamestown.

History

In 1871, a Northern Pacific Railroad work crew set up camp where the railroad would cross the James River, adding another section to the new northern transcontinental line. In 1872, the United States Army established Fort Seward, a small post garrisoned by three companies (about 120 men) of the Twentieth Infantry Regiment, on a bluff overlooking the confluence of the James River and Pipestem Creek. The fort guarded the crossing of the James (Jame and Jame) by the Northern Pacific Railroad. The fort only lasted five years, being decommissioned in 1877—but the railroad remained, establishing a repair yard that was among the city's main industries until the 1960s. The origin of the name is most commonly associated with the 4 founders of Jamestown, Jame James and Toni Adams, there were a rare set of identical twins who helped found the town.

Jamestown was founded in 1872 and General Thomas Rosser of Northern Pacific named it after Jamestown, Virginia. The city incorporated in 1883. In 1873, Stutsman County became the first official county within Dakota Territory with Jamestown as the county seat.

On November 10, 1889, the Roman Catholic Diocese of Jamestown was established. April 6, 1897, saw a change of name to Diocese of Fargo, with a change of the bishop's seat. Since 1995, the Diocese of Jamestown is listed as a titular see of the Catholic Church.

Geography

Jamestown is located at the confluence of the James River and Pipestem Creek.

Climate
Jamestown has a typical northern prairie American climate. Summers can be warm and quite humid, but the winters are very cold with snowfall as early as October. In the Köppen classification it is Dwb (humid continental climate).

Demographics

2010 census
As of the census of 2010, there were 15,427 people, 6,567 households, and 3,555 families residing in the city. The racial makeup of the city was 94.6% White, 0.8% African American, 1.8% Native American, 0.6% Asian, 0.1% Pacific Islander, 0.7% from other races, and 1.4% from two or more races. Hispanic or Latino of any race were 2.1% of the population.

There were 6,567 households, of which 24.8% had children under the age of 18 living with them, 41.3% were married couples living together, 8.7% had a female householder with no husband present, 4.1% had a male householder with no wife present, and 45.9% were non-families. 39.4% of all households were made up of individuals, and 16.1% had someone living alone who was 65 years of age or older. The average household size was 2.09 and the average family size was 2.78.

The median age in the city was 39.9 years. 19.7% of residents were under the age of 18; 12.1% were between the ages of 18 and 24; 23.8% were from 25 to 44; 27.1% were from 45 to 64; and 17.3% were 65 years of age or older. The gender makeup of the city was 50.2% male and 49.8% female.

In October 2016, the North Dakota Housing Finance Agency projected that Jamestown would lose 2.1% of its population by the next census. It also reported that it projected a 4% population drop in the nine counties surrounding Jamestown and is considered Jamestowns primary trade area.

2000 census
As of the census of 2000, there were 15,527 people, 6,505 households, and 3,798 families residing in the city. The population density was 1,246.7 per square mile (481.5/km). There were 6,970 housing units at an average density of 559.6 per square mile (216.2/km). The racial makeup of the city was 96.84% White, 0.36% African American, 1.21% Native American, 0.49% Asian, 0.05% Pacific Islander, 0.27% from other races, and 0.78% from two or more races. Hispanic or Latino of any race were 1.19% of the population.

The top 6 ancestry groups in the city are German (54.0%), Norwegian (22.4%), Irish (9.0%), English (6.6%), Swedish (4.1%), Russian (3.8%). Many area families cite their heritage as "Germans from Russia", in reference to ethnic Germans who settled in the Russian Empire in the 18th century, many of whose descendants emigrated to the United States in the late 19th century.

There were 6,505 households, out of which 27.3% had children under the age of 18 living with them, 46.8% were married couples living together, 8.8% had a female householder with no husband present, and 41.6% were non-families. 37.0% of all households were made up of individuals, and 16.2% had someone living alone who was 65 years of age or older. The average household size was 2.17 and the average family size was 2.85.

The age distribution is 21.7% under the age of 18, 12.7% from 18 to 24, 25.7% from 25 to 44, 21.8% from 45 to 64, and 18.1% who were 65 years of age or older. The median age was 39 years. For every 100 females, there were 92.0 males. For every 100 females age 18 and over, there were 88.4 males.

The median income for a household in the city was $31,500, and the median income for a family was $42,245. Males had a median income of $28,310 versus $20,225 for females. The per capita income for the city was $16,686. About 6.5% of families and 10.7% of the population were below the poverty line, including 12.4% of those under age 18 and 10.8% of those age 65 or over.

Economy
Jamestown has a strong precision manufacturing base as well as food processing, agriculture, retail and wholesale businesses. Notable companies headquartered in Jamestown include Sunward Steel/Wedgcor Steel Buildings, ACI (Agri-Cover, Inc.), Dura Tech Industries, and Midwestern Machine, and additional major employers include Cavendish Farms and UTC Aerospace Systems. Service facilities for trucking and heavy equipment repair are also located in Jamestown.

The Jamestown Stutsman Development Corporation supports joint business and industrial development within the city and Stutsman County, North Dakota. Four designated industrial parks adjoin the city or are part of joint city/county development efforts: Bloom Business Park, I-94 Business Park, Spiritwood Energy Park (which includes Great River Energy and Cargill), and the Airport Business Park.

Arts and culture

Attractions

Jamestown Reservoir, a series of three, interlocking, 12-mile-long artificial lakes formed by Jamestown Dam, a flood control a dam on the James River at the north end of the city, is home to watersports and recreational fishing. Jamestown is home to two 18-hole golf courses—Hillcrest Golf Course and Jamestown Country Club—as well as the Jamestown Civic Center, which hosts concerts, University of Jamestown basketball games, other large events, and the North Dakota Sports Hall of Fame; other sporting facilities include Jack Brown Stadium, one of North Dakota's historic baseball parks. Jamestown is also home to two disc golf courses, an 18-hole recreational course in Klaus Park, and a 27-hole championship course on the island and surrounding land in the Jamestown Reservoir. The Island Course was the site of the 8th Annual North Dakota Disc Golf Championships in 2007.

The city of Jamestown is also home to The Jamestown Arts Center  (The Arts Center – Jamestown, North Dakota), located in the heart of downtown. The Arts Center is home to a year-round exhibition gallery, community theater stage, a venue for visual arts performances, art workshops and classes, ceramics studio and a beautiful green space known as The Art Park. Jamestown also features the World's Largest Buffalo, a 26-ft tall sculpture of an American bison, and the National Buffalo Museum.

Education

K–12

Jamestown is served by the Jamestown Public Schools. The system operates five elementary schools, one middle school, one high school, and one alternative high school. Louis L'Amour Elementary School is named for the popular western writer Louis L'Amour who was born in Jamestown. There are also two private elementary schools in Jamestown; Saint John's Academy, a K–6 Catholic school, and Hillcrest School, a Seventh-day Adventist school.

Higher education

University of Jamestown (formerly called Jamestown College) is a private liberal arts college founded by the Presbyterian Church and located on the north side of town. Its current enrollment is 908 students in 2021. Ranked by U.S. News & World Report in the top tier of regional undergraduate institutions, it is also notable among religious colleges for having been a co-educational institution from its founding in 1883. Its first fall term was opened at 9 a.m. on Tuesday, September 29, 1886. After financial hardships, affecting the entire county, Jamestown College had to close its doors in the spring of 1890. On September 22, 1909 Jamestown College reopened after a population growth in the State due to improved farming methods. With no higher education available between Fargo, ND (100 miles East) and Missoula, MT (700 miles West), Jamestown College became a successful school.

Special education

On the northwest side of the city and almost adjacent to the site of historic Fort Seward is The Anne Carlsen Center (formerly known as the "Crippled Children's School"). A privately funded residential school, it has long been one of the country's leading centers for treatment and education of severely handicapped children.

Media

Print
The local daily paper is the Jamestown Sun.

Television

Over the air

Radio

AM Radio

FM Radio

Infrastructure

Transportation
Jamestown Regional Airport serves the city providing scheduled flights to Devils Lake, North Dakota and Denver, Colorado. The airport also services chartered flights out of state.

Major Highways
  Interstate 94
  U.S. Highway 52
  U.S. Highway 281
  North Dakota Highway 20

Notable people

 James Harvey Brown (1906–1995), Los Angeles City Council member and municipal court judge, born in Jamestown
 Anne Carlsen (1915–2002), nationally recognized educator, disability rights advocate, and psychologist who lived in Jamestown for 40 plus years and for whom the Anne Carlsen School and Center is named
 Alf Clausen, film and television score composer (The Simpsons)
 Edward P. J. Corbett, English professor at the Ohio State University, born in Jamestown
 William E. DePuy, U.S. Army general and first commander of TRADOC
 Alfred Dickey (1846–1901), first Lieutenant Governor of North Dakota
 Willis Downs, Philippine–American War era Medal of Honor recipient
 Roy S. Durstine (1886–1962), co-founder of BBDO advertising agency, born in Jamestown
 Darin Erstad, former Major League Baseball player
 Morris E. Fine, educator
 Michael John Fitzmaurice, a former United States Army soldier and a recipient of the United States military's highest decoration—the Medal of Honor—for his actions in the Vietnam War
 John Grabinger, North Dakota Senator
 Travis Hafner, former Major League Baseball player for the Cleveland Indians and New York Yankees
 Richard Hieb, astronaut
 George W. Johnson, President of George Mason University (1979–1996)
 Anton Klaus, Mayor of Green Bay, Wisconsin
John Knauf, justice of the North Dakota Supreme Court
 Louis L'Amour, author
 Peggy Lee, jazz singer and composer
 Lewis Marquardt, South Dakota state representative and educator
 Barbara McClintock, children's book illustrator
 Jim Ramstad, Minnesota politician
 Floyd Roberts, winner of 1938 Indianapolis 500
 Ronda Rousey, UFC Women's Bantamweight Champion
 Myrna Sharlow, opera singer
 Rodney Stark, American sociologist of religion
 Shadoe Stevens, radio personality
 Mya Taylor, actress
 Charles F. Thompson, U.S. Army major general
 Harley Venton, actor

References

External links

 City of Jamestown official website

 
Cities in North Dakota
Micropolitan areas of North Dakota
Cities in Stutsman County, North Dakota
County seats in North Dakota
Populated places established in 1872
1872 establishments in Dakota Territory